Stefano Greco (born 21 February 1999) is an Italian football player who plays for  club Gubbio.

Club career

Roma
He is a product of Roma youth teams and started appearing for their Under-19 squad in the 2016–17 season.

He first appeared for Roma's senior squad on 14 July 2018 in a pre-season friendly against Latina. He was called up to the senior squad on several occasions in the 2018–19 Serie A seasons, but did not make any appearances.

Loan to Vibonese
On 18 July 2019, Greco was loaned to Serie C club Vibonese on a season-long loan deal. He made his professional Serie C debut for Vibonese on 25 August 2019 in a season-starting game, a 1–0 away defeat against Monopoli. He established himself as Vibonese first-choice goalkeeper early in the season. Three weeks later, on 15 September, Greco kept his first clean sheet for the club, a 3–0 home win over Rende. Greco ended his season-long loan to Vibonese with 20 appearances, 30 goals conceded and only 1 clean sheet and he also remaining an unused substitute for 9 other league matches.

Loan to Pro Patria 
On 12 August 2020, Greco was signed by Serie C club Pro Patria on a season-long loan deal. On 27 September he made his debut for the club and he also kept his first clean sheet in a 0–0 away draw against Carrarese. Ten days later, on 7 October, he kept his second clean sheet in a 1–0 away win over Olbia, and on 10 October, his third in a 0–0 home draw against Pistoiese. Greco helped the club to reach the play-off, however the club lost 3–1 against Juventus U23 in the first round and he ended his season-long loan with 35 appearances, 27 goals conceded and 18 clean sheets.

Gubbio
On 9 February 2023, Greco signed with Gubbio.

International career
He was first called up to represent his country in 2014 with the Under-15 squad.

He later appeared for Under-16, Under-17 and Under-18 squads, all in friendlies. He was not selected for the 2016 UEFA European Under-17 Championship squad despite receiving call-ups at qualification stage.

Career statistics

Club

References

External links
 

1999 births
21st-century Italian people
Sportspeople from the Province of Lecce
Footballers from Apulia
Living people
Italian footballers
Italy youth international footballers
Association football goalkeepers
A.S. Roma players
U.S. Vibonese Calcio players
Aurora Pro Patria 1919 players
Potenza Calcio players
A.S. Gubbio 1910 players
Serie C players